Arnold Otieno Origi (born 15 November 1983) is a Kenyan professional footballer who plays as a goalkeeper for Hødd in the Norwegian 2. divisjon. He is one of the most successful keepers in Kenya, and the only Kenyan goalkeeper to play in Europe for more than 15 years.

Career

Club
Origi played for Mathare United and Tusker in his home country before joining Moss, where fellow Kenyan John Muiruri was already playing. After a short loan spell with Fredrikstad, and a brief stop at Ull/Kisa he joined Lillestrøm in 2013.

In January 2018, Origi was taken on trial by Premier League club Crystal Palace, but failed to gain a contract. As a consequence of Origi's trial at the British club, Lillestrøm had already found a replacement for him, Matvei Igonen. Therefore Origi and the club mutually agreed to terminate his contract so he could still find a new club after the transfer window closed.

After signing with Kongsvinger in September 2018, he left the club again at the end of the year.

International
Origi has played 45 international matches for Kenya (as of February 6, 2018).

On 23 August 2017, it was announced that Origi acquired Norwegian citizenship.

Personal life
Origi comes from a football family. His uncle Mike Origi was a professional footballer in Belgium. His father, Austin Oduor Origi, was a long term captain of Kenyan Premier League side Gor Mahia, and his other uncles Gerald and Anthony were defenders at Tusker. His uncle Divock plays for AC Milan in Italy's Seria A as well as the Belgium national team.

Career statistics

Club

International

Statistics accurate as of match played 6 September 2015

Honors

LIllestrøm Sk

Norwegian Cup:
Winners ::2017

Individual

 Lillestrøm Sk player of the Year 2015

References

External links
Origi joins Fredrikstad on loan from FK Moss-Michezo Afrika
Futaa – Kenyan Football Portal
Club bio

1983 births
Living people
Kenyan footballers
Norwegian footballers
Kenya international footballers
Tusker F.C. players
Mathare United F.C. players
Moss FK players
Fredrikstad FK players
Ullensaker/Kisa IL players
Lillestrøm SK players
Sandnes Ulf players
Kongsvinger IL Toppfotball players
HIFK Fotboll players
Eliteserien players
Norwegian First Division players
Norwegian Second Division players
Association football goalkeepers